In physics, the Schwinger model, named after Julian Schwinger,  is the model describing 1+1D (1 spatial dimension + time) Lorentzian quantum electrodynamics which includes electrons, coupled to photons. 

The model defines the usual QED Lagrangian

over a spacetime with one spatial dimension and one temporal dimension.  Where  is the  photon field strength,  is the gauge covariant derivative,  is the fermion spinor,  is the fermion mass and  form the two-dimensional representation of the Clifford algebra.

This model exhibits confinement of the fermions and as such, is a toy model for QCD. This model also exhibits a spontaneous symmetry breaking of the U(1) symmetry due to a chiral condensate due to a pool of instantons. The photon in this model becomes a massive particle at low temperatures. This model can be solved exactly and is used as a toy model for other more complex theories.

References 

Quantum field theory
Quantum electrodynamics
Exactly solvable models